Rombout II Keldermans (ca. 1460 in Mechelen – 15 December 1531 in Antwerp), was an important architect from the Gothic period, born from a family of architects and sculptors (see Keldermans family).

He was city architect of Mechelen and court architect for Charles V, Holy Roman Emperor, who elevated him into nobility.

He worked among others on the Onze-Lieve-Vrouw-over-de-Dijlekerk in Mechelen, the Cathedral of Our Lady in Antwerp and the city hall of Ghent.

References 

1460 births
1531 deaths
Gothic architects
Architects of the Habsburg Netherlands
People from Mechelen